T.C. Walker House is the historic home of a lawyer, county supervisor, and a school superintendent who was enslaved prior to the American Civil War. It is at 1 Main Street in Gloucester, Gloucester County, Virginia and was built about 1880, and is a two-story, "U"-shaped, frame vernacular dwelling with traces of Greek Revival and Gothic Revival styles.  It has a cross-gable roof, two-bay addition, and front porch.  It was the home of Thomas Calhoun "T.C." Walker, who worked tirelessly to improve African-American land ownership and educational opportunities. As a lawyer he represented many African American clients. He purchased the home in 1900. The house was donated to Hampton University in 1977.

Walker wrote an autobiography titled The Honey-Pod Tree. He was buried at the Bethel Baptist Church Cemetery. The home was added to the National Register of Historic Places in 2009.

References

African-American history of Virginia
Houses on the National Register of Historic Places in Virginia
Carpenter Gothic houses in Virginia
Houses completed in 1880
Houses in Gloucester County, Virginia
National Register of Historic Places in Gloucester County, Virginia
1880 establishments in Virginia